The siege of Sana'a took place when the Sasanian under military officer Vahrez besieged the Aksumite city of Sana'a in 570.

Sources 
 
 
 

570
570s conflicts
Sana'a
Aksumite Empire
6th century in Asia
Military history of Sanaa
Battles of pre-Islamic Arabia
Abyssinian–Persian wars
Sieges involving the Sasanian Empire
6th century in Iran